"Settle for a Slowdown" is a song co-written and recorded by American country music artist Dierks Bentley. It was released in January 2006 as the third and final single from his second studio album Modern Day Drifter. The song becoming Bentley's third #1 single on the U.S. Billboard Hot Country Songs chart. The song was written by Bentley, Brett Beavers and Tony Martin.

Content
The song is a mid-tempo ballad that paints a picture of a man watching his loved one pull away. He knows he cannot hold her back, but he just hopes that he will see brake lights, indicating that she at least paused for a moment before leaving him behind. Just knowing that she hesitated would be a measure of comfort, but it doesn't happen.

In the first verse, he is looking for a "slowdown" from his lover's vehicle while "getting soaked to the bone" (i.e., standing out in the rain). All he wants is to see the brake lights flash, just once, to know that she once loved him enough for the slightest hesitation, but she never does.

Critical reception
Deborah Evans Price, of Billboard magazine reviewed the song favorably, saying that the song serves up the theme "with a creative lyric that finds a fresh way of saying what we have all heard before." She goes on to say that Bentley "turns in a beautifully measured, thoughtful performance that oozes hurt tempered with reluctant resignation."

Music video
The music video was directed by Chris Hicky and premiered in early 2006. The music video paints a picture of a woman leaving Bentley and their trailer in the desert for Hollywood. Bentley eventually shows up in Hollywood at a mansion and sings the chorus acoustically.

Chart positions
"Settle for a Slowdown" debuted at number 47 on the U.S. Billboard Hot Country Songs for the week of January 28, 2006.

Year-end charts

Certifications

References

2006 singles
2005 songs
Dierks Bentley songs
Songs written by Dierks Bentley
Songs written by Brett Beavers
Songs written by Tony Martin (songwriter)
Music videos directed by Chris Hicky
Capitol Records Nashville singles
Song recordings produced by Brett Beavers